V Entertainment is an entertainment news series similar to E! News on American Broadcasting Channel E! Entertainment.

Programme content
Developed by M-Net, broadcasting simultaneously on Vuzu and Vuzu Amp (a more premium version of Vuzu) is South Africa's solution to E! News. V Entertainment covers local and international celebrities. The format for V Entertainment is largely based on the format used on E! News although its broadcasts are 30 minutes shorter in a smaller production studio. It broadcasts Mondays to Fridays at 18:00 (CAT) on both Vuzu & Vuzu Amp with a repeat at 23:00 (CAT) on Vuzu and 22:30 (CAT) on Vuzu Amp. It is the channel's flagship show and is broadcast live from the M-Net studios. Also broadcast live are red carpet specials for award shows and concerts mainly the Channel O African Music Video Awards. Some of South Africa's latest music videos also debut on the show exclusively. Despite its overwhelming growth and popularity throughout the years, the show announced its last episode on 29 June 2017, which was aired on 30 June 2017 with a one-hour special.

Hosts

Final hosts
Somizi Mhlongo Motaung
Siyabonga Scoop Ngwekazi
Nomuzi Mabena

Former hosts
 Zulu Mkhathini
Lalla Hirayama
Dineo Moeketsi Langa
Denise Zimba
Shelton Forbes
Cyprian Ndlovu
Nonhle Thema
Thomas Gumede
Siyabonga Scoop Ngwekazi
 Shane Eagle

Other/guest/celeb hosts
Dineo Ranaka
Anele Mdoda
Trevor Gumbi
Somizi Mhlongo
AKA
Metiza KaukuataMika StefanoLerato SengadiDa LesBonang''
Kamo Mphela 
Muesee kahuure

References

 http://citizen.co.za/your-life/your-life-entertainment-your-life/entertainment-celebrities/1063943/denises-exit-from-v-entertainment-shocks-fans/
 http://www.drum.co.za/celebs/v-entertainments-new-presenters/
 http://www.sabreakingnews.co.za/2016/03/20/nomuzi-joins-v-entertainment/

External links
http://vuzu.dstv.com [Vuzu on DSTV]
http://www.vuzu.tv [official site]

South African television news shows